Gouraya is a town and commune in Tipaza Province in northern Algeria. The majority of its inhabitants speak Tamazight language .

References

Communes of Tipaza Province
Tipaza Province